Derrickson is a surname. Notable people with the surname include:

 Kelly Derrickson, Canadian singer-songwriter
 Marcus Derrickson (born 1996), American basketball player
 Ronald Derrickson, Canadian indigenous leader
 Scott Derrickson (born 1966), American director, screenwriter, and producer